The Limping Man is a 1936 British crime film directed by Walter Summers and starring Francis L. Sullivan, Hugh Wakefield and Patricia Hilliard. It was an adaptation of the play of the same title by William Matthew Scott. The film was shot at Welwyn Studios.

Cast
 Francis L. Sullivan as Theodore Disher
 Hugh Wakefield as Colonel Paget
 Patricia Hilliard as Gloria Paget
 Robert Cochran as Philip Nash
 Leslie Perrins as Paul Hoyt
 Judy Kelly as Olga Hoyt
 Iris Hoey as Mrs. Paget
 Frank Atkinson as Inspector Cable
 George Pughe as Chicago Joe
 Harry Hutchinson as Limpy
 John Turnbull as Inspector Potts
 Syd Crossley as Sparrow
 Arthur Brander as Sandall

Bibliography
 Low, Rachael. History of the British Film: Filmmaking in 1930s Britain. George Allen & Unwin, 1985 .
Wood, Linda. British Films, 1927–1939. British Film Institute, 1986.

References

External links
 

1936 films
1930s English-language films
1936 crime films
British crime films
Films shot at Welwyn Studios
Films directed by Walter Summers
British black-and-white films
1930s British films